Dwarf frog may refer to:

 African dwarf frog (Hymenochirus), a genus of frogs native to Africa
 Beddome's dwarf wrinkled frog (Nyctibatrachus beddomii), a frog in the family Nyctibatrachidae endemic to southern Western Ghats, India
 Colorado dwarf frog (Engystomops coloradorum), a frog in the family Leptodactylidae endemic to Ecuador
 Cuyaba dwarf frog (Physalaemus nattereri), a frog in the family Leptodactylidae native to Brazil and eastern Bolivia and Paraguay
 Dwarf puddle frog (Phrynobatrachus), a genus of frogs in the family Phrynobatrachidae found in Sub-Saharan Africa
 Dwarf reed frog (Hyperolius pusillus), a frog in the family Hyperoliidae found in eastern and southern Africa (Botswana, Eswatini, Kenya, Malawi, Mozambique, Somalia, South Africa, Tanzania, Zimbabwe)
 Dwarf rocket frog (Litoria dorsalis), is a frog in the family Hylidae found in Papua New Guinea and possibly Indonesia
 Dwarf swamp frog (Pseudopaludicola), a genus of frog in the family Leptodactylidae found in South America
 Golden dwarf reed frog (Afrixalus aureus), a frog in the family Hyperoliidae found in Eswatini, Mozambique, South Africa, and possibly Zimbabwe
 Guayaquil dwarf frog (Engystomops pustulatus), a species of frog in the family Leptodactylidae found in southwestern Ecuador and northwestern Peru
 Merlin's dwarf gray frog (Pseudhymenochirus merlini), a frog in the family Pipidae found in Guinea, Guinea-Bissau, and Sierra Leone
 Mjöberg's dwarf litter frog (Leptobrachella mjobergi), a frog in the family Megophryidae endemic to Borneo
 Peters' dwarf frog (Engystomops petersi), a frog in the family Leptodactylidae found in Amazonian Colombia, Ecuador, and Peru

Animal common name disambiguation pages